In Israel, the mixed cities or mixed towns are the eight cities with a significant number of both Israeli Jews and Israeli Arabs. The eight mixed Jewish-Arab cities, defined by the Israel Central Bureau of Statistics as those with more than 10% of the population registered as "Arabs" and more than 10% of the population registered as "Jews", include the following seven Israeli cities: Haifa, Lod, Ramle, Jaffa (now a part of Tel Aviv), Acre, Nof HaGalil (formerly Nazareth Illit), and Ma'alot Tarshiha. Approximately 10% of the Arab citizens of Israel live in these seven cities. The eighth city is Jerusalem, in which the Arab part of the city, East Jerusalem, has been annexed by Israel but is not recognized as such under international law.

The eight mixed cities are the main places in which Jews and Arabs encounter each other, and very limited population mixing exists in Israel outside of these eight cities. The term "mixed cities" should not be confused with multicultural cities, nor understood to necessarily imply social integration. As a result the topic has attracted significant scholarly focus over many years, and since the Second Intifada it became at the crux of social science scholarship in Israel.

History

In the early 19th century, only Jerusalem, Safed and Tiberias had small yet significant minority Jewish populations living alongside the majority Arabs. These populations grew to become about half the cities' populations by the start of the British Mandate. Immigration and settlement also took place on the outskirts of the cities of Jaffa (these outskirts later became known as Tel Aviv) and Haifa during the same period. As a result of the Palestinian expulsions and fleeing of violence during 1948, Safed and Tiberias were depopulated of all Palestinian Arabs and became exclusively Jewish, whilst Jerusalem was split into Jewish West Jerusalem and Palestinian Arab East Jerusalem. Of those "original" mixed cities, only Haifa remained mixed after the war. However, after 1948 only about 3,000 of its 70,000 Palestinian Arab residents remained in Haifa; these remaining Palestinian Arabs were then moved into small areas of the city by the new Israeli authorities. Today, about 12% of Haifa's residents are Palestinian Arab.

Ramla, Lod, Jaffa and Acre became mixed as a result of the 1948 Palestinian exodus. These cities had almost 100% Palestinian Arab populations prior to 1948, but after the war only about 1,000 Palestinian Arabs remained in Ramla and Lod, and 13,000 in Acre, mostly in the poorest segments of society and initially restricted to segregated compounds under Israeli martial law. Internally displaced Palestinians from other areas moved to the cities in subsequent decades; today Palestinian Arabs account for 30% of Lod's population, 25% of Ramle's, 30% of Acre's, and 5% of Tel Aviv-Jaffa.

The unique cities of Nof Hagalil and Ma'alot-Tarshiha became mixed through Israeli Arab influx and a municipal merger, respectively. In Nof Hagalil, the population is almost 30% Arab, but the municipality has refused to allow the building of any churches, mosques or Arabic-speaking schools.

Integration 
The term "mixed cities" should not be confused with multicultural cities, nor understood to necessarily imply social integration. Scholars describe significant geographical segregation and social exclusion within each of the eight cities, which contradicts "Israel's self-image as a pluralist and democratic society" and the "narrative of continuous historical coexistence". Most Arabs in mixed cities live in predominantly Arab neighborhoods and studies have shown a significant inequality in municipal resource allocation, and wide socio-economic gaps in welfare, housing and education between the two communities. According to the New York Times, even towns "portrayed as models of peaceful coexistence fester with resentments born of double standards." According to Yara Hawari, there is significant geographical segregation and social exclusion within each of the eight cities, contradicting "Israel's self-image as a pluralist and democratic society".

In October 2021, following the May 2021 racial riots centered in the mixed cities, the Israeli government approved a new five-year plan aimed at reducing years of state neglect of the inequalities between Jewish and Arab citizens, with an emphasis on addressing Israel's mixed city problems.

Demographics

Mixed cities

Other mixed areas
According to publicist Afif Abu Much, the eight mixed cities are the main places in Israel in which Jews and Arabs encounter each other, and very limited population mixing exists outside of these eight cities.

According to Ha'aretz in 2015, only 16,000 Arabs are thought to be living in 16 localities not officially defined as mixed cities, or in Jewish neighborhoods of Haifa, Jerusalem and Tel Aviv. According to the 2020 population statistics the vast majority of other Jewish- or Arab-majority localities in Israel have between 0% and 1% of the other population group. According to the Israel Central Bureau of Statistics, the only sizeable exceptions are the Jewish majority cities of Eilat (5% Arab), Carmiel (4%), Qiryat Shemona (3%), Arad (3%), Beersheva (3%), Nahariyya (2%), Safed (2%) and Tiberias (2%), and the Arab-majority cities of Mi'elya (3% Jewish) and Jaljulye (2%).

See also
 Arab localities in Israel

Bibliography

General

Specific locations

Population data
 Israel Central Bureau of Statistics, "Settlements"

References

 
Arab localities in Israel
Arab citizens of Israel
Lists of populated places in Israel